Khaldoun Ibrahim Mohammed Albu-Mohammed (born 16 June 1987 in Iraq) is a former Iraqi footballer. He is a defensive midfielder who last played for Naft Al-Wasat in Iraq Premier League, and is a member of the Iraq national football team. His older brother is Ous Ibrahim, also a national player.

Honours

Club
Erbil SC
2008–09 Iraqi Premier League winner

Country 
Iraq National football team
 2007 Asian Cup winners
 2012 WAFF Championship: runner-up
 21st Arabian Gulf Cup: runner-up

References

External links

Iraqi footballers
Iraq international footballers
Expatriate footballers in Iran
Sanat Mes Kerman F.C. players
Iraqi expatriate footballers
Association football utility players
Al-Zawraa SC players
2007 AFC Asian Cup players
AFC Asian Cup-winning players
Living people
1987 births
Amanat Baghdad players
Al-Shorta SC players
Association football midfielders